Irina Sergeyeva may refer to:

Irina Privalova (born 1968), (née Sergeyeva) sprint athlete and Olympic gold medallist in hurdling
Irina Sergeyeva (born 1987), long-distance runner